Pedro Gando (20 July 1936 – 1 August 2012) was an Ecuadorian footballer who played as a midfielder. He played in six matches for the Ecuador national football team in 1963. He was also part of Ecuador's squad for the 1963 South American Championship.

References

1936 births
2012 deaths
Ecuadorian footballers
Ecuador international footballers
Association football midfielders
Sportspeople from Guayaquil